Multiple Sclerosis Society may refer to:

The Multiple Sclerosis Society of Great Britain
The Multiple Sclerosis Society of Canada
The National Multiple Sclerosis Society of the United States.
Other multiple sclerosis societies